Lebanon is a borough in Hunterdon County,in the U.S. state of New Jersey. As of the 2020 United States census, the borough's population was 1,665, an increase of 307 (+22.6%) from the 2010 census count of 1,358, which in turn reflected an increase of 293 (+27.5%) from the 1,065 counted in the 2000 census.

Lebanon was incorporated as a borough by an act of the New Jersey Legislature on March 26, 1926, from portions of Clinton Township, based on the results of a referendum held on April 20, 1926. Additional portions of Clinton Township were annexed in 1962.

The borough is located north of the Round Valley Reservoir. The Borough was known in the early part of the 19th century as Jacksonville and later as Lebanonville, Lebanonville Depot and finally Lebanon, a station on the Central Railroad of New Jersey. The center of Lebanon has changed little in the past century. The Dutch Reformed Church is one of the oldest churches in the County. Records of the church begin in 1769, however, the church is cited as early as 1747. The Lebanon Historic District was listed on the state and national registers of historic places in 2009.

Geography
According to the United States Census Bureau, the borough had a total area of 0.90 square miles (2.34 km2), almost all of which was land.

The borough is an independent municipality surrounded by Clinton Township, making it part of one of 21 pairs of "doughnut towns" in the state, where one municipality entirely surrounds another.

Demographics

2010 census
    The Census Bureau's 2006–2010 American Community Survey showed that (in 2010 inflation-adjusted dollars) median household income was $71,629 (with a margin of error of +/− $5,410) and the median family income was $96,500 (+/− $10,275). Males had a median income of $70,977 (+/− $9,418) versus $53,750 (+/− $18,758) for females. The per capita income for the borough was $37,035 (+/− $2,975). About 1.5% of families and 2.8% of the population were below the poverty line, including 1.3% of those under age 18 and 1.8% of those age 65 or over.

2000 census
As of the 2000 United States census there were 1,065 people, 458 households, and 287 families residing in the borough. The population density was 1,227.3 people per square mile (472.6/km2). There were 477 housing units at an average density of 549.7 per square mile (211.7/km2). The racial makeup of the borough was 95.40% White, 0.66% African American, 0.19% Native American, 3.10% Asian, 0.38% from other races, and 0.28% from two or more races. Hispanic or Latino of any race were 2.07% of the population.

There were 458 households, out of which 30.8% had children under the age of 18 living with them, 50.4% were married couples living together, 9.6% had a female householder with no husband present, and 37.3% were non-families. 33.0% of all households were made up of individuals, and 10.5% had someone living alone who was 65 years of age or older. The average household size was 2.33 and the average family size was 2.97.

In the borough the population was spread out, with 24.1% under the age of 18, 3.7% from 18 to 24, 35.1% from 25 to 44, 25.4% from 45 to 64, and 11.6% who were 65 years of age or older. The median age was 39 years. For every 100 females, there were 92.2 males. For every 100 females age 18 and over, there were 82.4 males.

The median income for a household in the borough was $68,542, and the median income for a family was $83,436. Males had a median income of $52,316 versus $37,396 for females. The per capita income for the borough was $34,066. About 0.7% of families and 3.6% of the population were below the poverty line, including 2.0% of those under age 18 and 5.1% of those age 65 or over.

Government

Local government
Lebanon Borough is governed under the Borough form of New Jersey municipal government, one of 218 municipalities (of the 564) statewide that use this form, the most common form of government in New Jersey. The governing body is comprised of the Mayor and the Borough Council, with all positions elected at-large on a partisan basis as part of the November general election. The Mayor is elected directly by the voters to a four-year term of office. The Borough Council is comprised of six members elected to serve three-year terms on a staggered basis, with two seats coming up for election each year in a three-year cycle. The Borough form of government used by Lebanon is a "weak mayor / strong council" government in which council members act as the legislative body with the mayor presiding at meetings and voting only in the event of a tie. The mayor can veto ordinances subject to an override by a two-thirds majority vote of the council. The mayor makes committee and liaison assignments for council members, and most appointments are made by the mayor with the advice and consent of the council.

, the Mayor of Lebanon Borough is Republican James J. Pittinger, whose term of office ends December 31, 2022. The Lebanon Borough Council is comprised of Council President Richard J. Burton (R, 2024), Marlene G. Baldinger (D, 2022), Samuel Berger (R, 2024), Joseph Cortese (R, 2022; elected to serve an unexpired term), James Lance (R, 2023) and Mary Basile Logan (R, 2023).

In August 2019, the Borough Council selected Melissa Saharic to fill the seat expiring in December 2020 that became vacant following the resignation of Michael Piagentini, who left office the previous month after announcing that he was moving out of the borough. In November 2019, Saharic was elected to serve the balance of the term of office.

After Republican incumbent Barbara "Bonnie" Schmidt and Democratic challenger Marlene Baldinger ended up tied with 431 votes for the second of two council seats in the November 2016 general election, the two faced off in a January runoff, which Baldinger won by a 183-135 margin.

Federal, state and county representation
Lebanon Borough is located in the 7th Congressional District and is part of New Jersey's 23rd state legislative district.

Politics
As of March 2011, there were a total of 955 registered voters in Lebanon, of which 190 (19.9%) were registered as Democrats, 374 (39.2%) were registered as Republicans and 388 (40.6%) were registered as Unaffiliated. There were three voters registered as Libertarians or Greens.

In the 2012 presidential election, Republican Mitt Romney received 57.5% of the vote (471 cast), ahead of Democrat Barack Obama with 40.9% (335 votes), and other candidates with 1.6% (13 votes), among the 826 ballots cast by the borough's 1,118 registered voters (7 ballots were spoiled), for a turnout of 73.9%. In the 2008 presidential election, Republican John McCain received 56.7% of the vote (403 cast), ahead of Democrat Barack Obama with 41.4% (294 votes) and other candidates with 1.3% (9 votes), among the 711 ballots cast by the borough's 861 registered voters, for a turnout of 82.6%. In the 2004 presidential election, Republican George W. Bush received 63.0% of the vote (410 ballots cast), outpolling Democrat John Kerry with 36.1% (235 votes) and other candidates with 0.6% (5 votes), among the 651 ballots cast by the borough's 780 registered voters, for a turnout percentage of 83.5.

In the 2013 gubernatorial election, Republican Chris Christie received 77.1% of the vote (373 cast), ahead of Democrat Barbara Buono with 20.5% (99 votes), and other candidates with 2.5% (12 votes), among the 497 ballots cast by the borough's 1,107 registered voters (13 ballots were spoiled), for a turnout of 44.9%. In the 2009 gubernatorial election, Republican Chris Christie received 67.1% of the vote (365 ballots cast), ahead of  Democrat Jon Corzine with 19.9% (108 votes), Independent Chris Daggett with 10.1% (55 votes) and other candidates with 1.7% (9 votes), among the 544 ballots cast by the borough's 880 registered voters, yielding a 61.8% turnout.

Historic district

The Lebanon Historic District is a historic district encompassing the village of Lebanon. It includes 227 contributing buildings.

Education
Students in pre-kindergarten through sixth grade for public school are served by the Lebanon Borough School District at Lebanon Borough School. As of the 2018–19 school year, the district, comprised of one school, had an enrollment of 40 students and 13.8 classroom teachers (on an FTE basis), for a student–teacher ratio of 2.9:1. In the 2016–17 school year, Lebanon had the ninth-smallest enrollment of any school district in the state, with 101 students.

Students in seventh and eighth grades attend Clinton Township Middle School in Clinton Township as part of a sending/receiving relationship with the Clinton Township School District. As of the 2018–19 school year, the middle school had an enrollment of 479 students and 57.0 classroom teachers (on an FTE basis), for a student–teacher ratio of 8.4:1.

Public school students in ninth through twelfth grades attend North Hunterdon High School in Annandale together with students from Bethlehem Township, Clinton Town, Clinton Township, Franklin Township and Union Township. As of the 2018–19 school year, the high school had an enrollment of 1,584 students and 123.2 classroom teachers (on an FTE basis), for a student–teacher ratio of 12.9:1. The school is part of the North Hunterdon-Voorhees Regional High School District, which also includes students from Califon, Glen Gardner, Hampton, High Bridge, Lebanon Township and Tewksbury Township, who attend Voorhees High School in Lebanon Township.

Eighth grade students from all of Hunterdon County are eligible to apply to attend the high school programs offered by the Hunterdon County Vocational School District, a county-wide vocational school district that offers career and technical education at its campuses in Raritan Township and at programs sited at local high schools, with no tuition charged to students for attendance.

Emergency services
The Borough of Lebanon is covered by three emergency services providers.

Police and law enforcement is provided by the New Jersey State Police from Troop B, based at the Perryville station.

The Lebanon Volunteer Fire Company provides fire suppression to the borough as per ordinance.

The borough's Emergency Medical and Rescue services are provided by the Clinton First Aid & Rescue Squad.

Transportation

Roads and highways

U.S. Route 22 passes through the center of town. Interstate 78 runs through the northern part with Exit 20 within its borders.

Public transportation
The Lebanon station offers service on NJ Transit's Raritan Valley Line. There is a station building on the south side of the tracks.  The northern track is no longer in use and the stop has limited weekday and no weekend service.

Gallery

Notable people

People who were born in, residents of, or otherwise closely associated with Lebanon include:

 Alvah A. Clark (1840–1912), represented  in the United States House of Representatives from 1877 to 1881
 James N. Pidcock (1836–1899), represented  in the United States House of Representatives from 1885 to 1889

Points of interest
 Hunterdon County Arboretum
 Round Valley Reservoir
 Cushetunk Mountain

References

External links

 Lebanon Borough website
 Hunterdon County webpage for Lebanon Borough
 Lebanon Borough School District
 
 School Data for the Lebanon Borough School District, National Center for Education Statistics
 Clinton Township School District
 North Hunterdon-Voorhees Regional High School District
 Hunterdon Land Trust Alliance

 
1926 establishments in New Jersey
Borough form of New Jersey government
Boroughs in Hunterdon County, New Jersey
Populated places established in 1926
National Register of Historic Places in Hunterdon County, New Jersey
Historic districts on the National Register of Historic Places in New Jersey
New Jersey Register of Historic Places